Sydney Albert Robert Badeley (7 April 1902 – 28 December 1981) was a New Zealand cricketer. He played four first-class matches for Auckland in 1929/30.

Two brothers Cecil Badeley and Vic Badeley were notable rugby union players (All Blacks).

See also
 List of Auckland representative cricketers

References

External links
 

1902 births
1981 deaths
New Zealand cricketers
Auckland cricketers
Cricketers from Auckland